The 1977–78 Biathlon World Cup was a multi-race tournament over a season of biathlon, organised by the UIPMB (Union Internationale de Pentathlon Moderne et Biathlon). The season started on 13 January 1978 in Ruhpolding, West Germany, and ended in April 1978 in Sodankylä, Finland. It was the first ever season of the Biathlon World Cup, and it was only held for men.

Calendar
Below is the World Cup calendar for the 1977–78 season.

*The relays were technically unofficial races as they did not count towards anything in the World Cup.

World Cup Podium

Men

Standings: Men

Overall 

Final standings after 10 races.

Achievements
First World Cup career victory
, 22, in his 1st season — the WC 1 Individual in Ruhpolding; it also was his first podium and the first podium for an East German biathlete
, 29, in his 1st season — the WC 1 Sprint in Ruhpolding; it also was his first podium and the first podium for a Norwegian biathlete
, 20, in his 1st season — the WC 2 Individual in Ruhpolding; first podium was 1977–78 Sprint in Ruhpolding
, 21, in his 1st season — the World Championships Individual in Hochfilzen; it also was his first podium
, 28, in his 1st season — the WC 3 Individual in Murmansk; first podium was 1977–78 Individual in Antholz-Anterselva
, 27, in his 1st season — the WC 4 Sprint in Sodankylä; first podium was 1977–78 Sprint in Antholz-Anterselva

First World Cup podium
, 27, in his 1st season — no. 2 in the WC 1 Individual in Ruhpolding
, 24, in his 1st season — no. 3 in the WC 1 Individual in Ruhpolding; it also was the first podium for a West German biathlete
, 19, in his 1st season — no. 3 in the WC 1 Sprint in Ruhpolding
, 29, in his 1st season — no. 2 in the WC 2 Individual in Antholz-Anterselva; it also was the first podium for a Soviet biathlete
, 28, in his 1st season — no. 3 in the WC 2 Individual in Antholz-Anterselva
, 26, in his 1st season — no. 2 in the WC 3 Individual in Murmansk
, in his 1st season — no. 3 in the WC 3 Individual in Murmansk
, 26, in his 1st season — no. 3 in the WC 2 Sprint in Antholz-Anterselva
, in his 1st season — no. 2 in the WC 4 Individual in Sodankylä
, 25, in his 1st season — no. 3 in the WC 4 Individual in Sodankylä
, 30, in his 1st season — no. 2 in the WC 4 Sprint in Sodankylä; it also was the first podium for a Finnish biathlete
, 31, in his 1st season — no. 3 in the WC 4 Sprint in Sodankylä

Victory in this World Cup (all-time number of victories in parentheses)
, 3 (3) first places
, 3 (3) first places
, 1 (1) first place
, 1 (1) first place
, 1 (1) first place
, 1 (1) first place

Retirements
Following notable biathletes retired after the 1977–78 season:

References

Biathlon World Cup
World Cup